Edward Joseph Hanna (July 21, 1860 – July 10, 1944) was an American prelate of the Roman Catholic Church. He served as archbishop of San Francisco from 1915 to 1935.

Early life and education
Edward Hanna was born in Rochester, New York, to Edward and Anne (née Clark) Hanna, who were Irish immigrants. The eldest of six children, he had two brothers and three sisters, one of whom died in infancy. In 1867, at age seven, he began his education at Public School No. 2 in his native city. The following year, he was sent to St. Patrick's School. He entered Rochester Free Academy in 1875, and graduated as valedictorian in 1879. He there befriended his classmate, Walter Rauschenbusch, a future Baptist theologian and proponent of the Social Gospel. He and Rauschenbusch were two of the nineteen founding brothers of Pi Phi Fraternity at the academy in 1878. At the commencement ceremony, he delivered a well-received oration on Irish political leader Daniel O'Connell.

Deciding to become a priest, Hanna was sent by Bernard John McQuaid to study at the Pontifical North American College and the Urban College of Propaganda. His professor at the Propaganda, Benedetto Lorenzelli, selected him and fellow student Edward A. Pace as the American representatives at a philosophical disputation before Pope Leo XIII in 1882.

Early ministry
On May 30, 1885, Hanna was ordained to the priesthood by Giulio Lenti at the Basilica of St. John Lateran. Pope Leo XIII conferred a Doctor of Sacred Theology degree on him without the need for an oral examination in 1886.

He was a professor at St. Bernard's Seminary from 1893 to 1912. On October 22, 1912, he was elected by Pope Pius X as auxiliary bishop for the Archdiocese of San Francisco and titular bishop of Titiopolis. He was ordained to the episcopate on December 4, 1912. During his time as archbishop, he resided in the Archbishop's Mansion in San Francisco.

Archepiscopate
Following the death of Patrick William Riordan on December 27, 1914. Pope Benedict XV appointed Hanna the third archbishop of San Francisco on June 1, 1915.

Hanna had a close friendship with San Francisco Mayor James Rolph Jr. The archbishop and "Sunny Jim" were seen at many civic functions. Hanna supported Rolph in his run for governor in 1930.

As archbishop, Hanna was often tasked with helping resolve labor disputes. In 1921, he was named chairman of San Francisco's wage arbitration boards; Hanna served on the boards through 1924. As governor, Rolph appointed Hanna as the chairman of a state mediation board to resolve the 1933 cotton strike in Corcoran, California. During the 1934 West Coast waterfront strike, President Franklin Roosevelt named Hanna the chairman of the National Longshoremen's Board. The board was tasked with resolving the strike by mediating between the International Longshoremen's Association, the International Seamen's Union, and their employers.

In 1923 his portrait was painted three-quarters seated by the Swiss-born American portrait painter Adolfo Müller-Ury (1862–1947), shortly afterwards being exhibited at Gump's, in San Francisco.

Hanna was key to the founding of St. Joseph's Seminary in Mountain View, California, and it was considered "the jewel of his accomplishments".

National Catholic Welfare Council

In 1919, Hanna was elected by the bishops of the United States as the first chairman of the National Catholic Welfare Council, a predecessor of the United States Conference of Catholic Bishops, which was renamed the National Catholic Welfare Conference in 1922; he continued as chairman through his retirement in 1935. As chairman, he was responsible for coordinating the American bishops' lobbying efforts and response to the domestic and foreign policies of the government.

Retirement and death
 
Archbishop Hanna retired March 2, 1935, due to ill health and advancing age. Pope Pius XI appointed Hanna the titular archbishop of Gortyna. He was succeeded as archbishop of San Francisco by John Joseph Mitty. Hanna moved to Rome after his retirement, where he died on July 10, 1944. Hanna's body was returned to San Francisco in 1947. He is buried in the Archbishop's Crypt at Holy Cross Cemetery in Colma, California.

Archbishop Hanna High School, part of the Hanna Boys Center in Sonoma, California, since 1945, is a residential treatment center for at-risk boys.

See also

References

Biography
Gribble, Richard, CSC. An Archbishop for the People: The Life of Edward J. Hanna. Boston: Paulist Press, 2006.

External links
 

Roman Catholic archbishops of San Francisco
20th-century Roman Catholic archbishops in the United States
Religious leaders from Rochester, New York
1860 births
1944 deaths
Rochester Free Academy alumni